Dereham, also known as East Dereham, is a town and civil parish in the Breckland District of the English county of Norfolk. It is situated on the A47 road, about 15 miles (25 km) west of the city of Norwich and 25 miles (40 km) east of King's Lynn.

Dereham falls within, and is the centre of administration for, Breckland District Council. The town should not be confused with the Norfolk village of West Dereham, which lies about 25 miles (40 km) away.

Since 1983, Dereham has been twinned with the town of Rüthen in North Rhine-Westphalia, Germany. It is also twinned with Caudebec-lès-Elbeuf, France.
In spite of the reunification of Germany in 1990, the sign on the A47 at the entrance to Dereham from the Swaffham direction still refers to Rüthen being in West Germany; this sparks periodic comment in the local press.

History

Early history
It is believed that Dereham's name derives from a deer park that existed in the area, in perhaps the seventh century, since a rough translation of the name is "enclosure for deer". That is quite recent however, since it is known that the town pre-dates the Saxon era.

According to local tradition, Saint Wihtburh (aka Withburga), the youngest daughter of Anna, King of the East Angles, founded a monastery and a convent there in the seventh century after seeing a vision of the Virgin Mary, although the Venerable Bede does not mention her in his writings. The monastery is mentioned by Bede, but little further is known of it and no evidence survives today.

An archaeological report by Norfolk County Council indicates that the first "documentary evidence" of a settlement in this area was not until AD 798, however. The Domesday Book of 1086 states that in the eleventh century, "St Etheldreda held Dereham that was already an important market centre with three mills". The report adds that the growing community was centred around St. Nicholas Church, from the Norman era; the structure was altered during the 1200s, 1300s and 1400s. Because numerous medieval buildings were destroyed in fires during 1581 and 1679, the town appears to have a Georgian aspect.

A Neolithic polished greenstone axe head was found near the town in 1986, with a Neolithic axe head, flint scraper and other tools and worked flints also found in local fields during the 1980s. There is evidence that the area was occupied during the Bronze Age, with burnt flints from a pot boiler site being found in 1976 and another burnt mound site located in 1987.

In 2000, an enamelled bridle bit dating from the Iron Age was discovered, with pottery sherds also being found by field walkers in 1983. The town is believed to be on the Roman Road linking the Brampton with the major east-west Roman Road of the Fen Causeway. Some pottery and furniture remains have been found in local fields.

In 2004, the largest number of Roman coins found in Norfolk was discovered in Dereham, over 1000 from the third century. A dig provided no evidence of Roman occupation, however.

Edmund Bonner, later to become the infamous 'burning bishop', was the Rector for Dereham from 1534 to 1538. Many of the town's ancient buildings were destroyed in the serious fires that took place in 1581 and 1659. Notable buildings that survived the fire include the Church of Saint Nicholas and the nearby Bishop Bonner's cottage. Dereham was administered by the Abbots, then the Bishops of Ely, until the parish was taken from the church by Queen Elizabeth I.

Napoleonic Conflict

In the late 1700s, Dereham church's bell tower was used as a prison for French prisoners of war being transferred from Great Yarmouth to Norman Cross under the charge of the East Norfolk Militia. On 6 October 1799, a French officer, Jean de Narde, managed to escape from the tower and, being unable to escape from the church yard due to guards being present, hid in a tree. The Frenchman was spotted and shot when he refused to come down and surrender. Jean is buried in the churchyard and his grave is marked by a memorial stone erected in 1858, which includes the following statement: "Once our foes but now our allies and brethren."
This story is told in the documentary, "The shooting of Jean DeNarde". Jean de Narde's link with Dereham is commemorated by a road named for him just off the B1146 as one approaches the town from the north.

One of the windmills built during this era, the Grade II Listed East Dereham Windmill (built in 1836) was known as the Norwich Road Mill or Fendick's Mill; it was constructed by James Hardy for Michael Hardy who owned a smock mill at Bittering. The windmill continued to use wind power until 1922 when it was converted to use engine power. The facility closed in 1937. It was restored and reopened as an exhibition centre in 2013.

Dereham Rifle Volunteer Corps 
In June 1859, a public meeting was held ar the Corn Hall for the formation of a Dereham Rifle Volunteer Corps. The Reverend Armstrong made a short speech urging people to join; around thirty men did, the eldest was an elderly fat banker of 70 years and the youngest a seventeen-year-old.  They were kitted out in a grey uniform. The Corps met regularly for drill and exercise.  When the Prince and Princess of Wales, and the Queen of Denmark arrived at the town's railway station, the Dereham Rifles attended to form a guard of honour.

William Earle G. Lytton Bulwer, formerly a lieutenant and captain in the Scots Fusilier Guards, was commanding the Dereham Corps in 1861. In June 1867, the Corps, recorded as the 15th Corps, attended a volunteer encampment at Hunstanton. The unit was, at that time, still under the command of Captain Bulwer and formed the tenth tent line.  Dereham was the headquarters of 5th, 6th, 11th, 12th, 15th, 16th, 17th, 19th, 23rd and 24th Corps. The Right Hon. Lord Suffield was appointed Honorary Colonel on 18 May 1866. The Quebec Street drill hall opened in 1866.

First World War
At the outbreak of war, the 5th Battalion, Norfolk Regiment, kept their HQ in Quebec Street but were based in the Corn Hall, and used the Masonic Hall on Norwich Road as a store, with the Assembly Rooms being used for medical inspections.

Dereham suffered damage during a Zeppelin air raid during the night of 8 September 1915. Damaged buildings included the headquarters of the 5th Norfolk Regiment at their premises on the corner of Church Street and Quebec Street. The raid also hit The White Lion public house on Church Street, seriously injuring two customers. The roof was destroyed and The White Lion never reopened as a public house. The old Vicarage was used as a Red Cross hospital.

In December 1915, Zeppelin L14 dropped bombs between Bylaugh Park and Dereham. Seventy-five bombs were dropped on Dereham, with several houses destroyed and eight or nine bombs dropped onto the Red Cross hospital established in the vicarage, although these failed to detonate. Another bomb hit the guildhall and destroyed windows in the church.  Four people were killed and six injured during the raid, with the coroner's report stating that the deaths were caused by bombs "unlawfully dropped from a Zeppelin aircraft."

World War II
Dereham was declared a Nodal Point during the Second World War and was partially fortified to slow down any German invasion of the country. Several defensive structures were built. One surviving pill box, in the railway station yard, is preserved as a memorial by the Royal British Legion; several others were built but are no longer visible. Additional Air Ministry sidings were laid in the town in 1943.

A Cold War era bunker was built underground near the Guild Hall.

Railways

The railway arrived in Dereham in 1847, when a single track line to  opened. A line from Dereham to Fakenham was opened in 1849; this line being extended to the coastal town of Wells-next-the-Sea by 1857. The town's railways became part of the Great Eastern Railway in 1862. Dereham had its own railway depot and a large complex of sidings, serving local industry. The line between Dereham and Wymondham was doubled, in 1882, to allow for the increasing levels of traffic.

Passenger services between Dereham and Wells were withdrawn in 1964 and the track between Fakenham and Wells was lifted soon after. The line to King's Lynn was closed in 1968 and the last passenger train on the Dereham-to-Wymondham line ran in 1969, although the railway remained open for freight until 1989.

Dereham labels itself "The Heart of Norfolk" owing to its central location in the county, the Tesco car park being cited as the exact centre. In the spring of 1978, the "Heart" was given the seven-mile £5m part-dual-carriageway A47 bypass. A section of this road, between Scarning and Wendling, was built along the former railway line towards Swaffham and King's Lynn. This section of railway had been used as a location for the filming of Dad's Army, where Captain Mainwaring is left dangling from a railway bridge after a flight on a barrage balloon. Dereham railway station was also a filming location for the opening scene of the BBC's 2018 series Bodyguard.

Transport

Roads
The A47 road from Lowestoft to Birmingham once ran through the centre of the town. The 7 mile (11.3 km) £5 million part-dual-carriageway East Dereham by-pass was built on part of the disused railway line to King's Lynn, opening in spring 1978. The single-track B1135 runs southwards toward Wymondham, the B1146 connects it northwards to Fakenham, and the A1075 connects the town to Watton and Thetford.

Cycling
National Cycle Route 13 runs through Dereham, joining with National Cycle Route 1 north of the town.

Buses
Frequent bus services operate from Dereham to Norwich and Peterborough; less frequent services are provided for several local villages.  Dereham does not have a bus station, with most services operating through the marketplace.

Railway
Dereham is not currently served by National Rail services.

Heritage railway

This charitable company is gradually reopening the line through North Elmham and supports the restoration of the line to Fakenham. As well as running heritage trains, the MNR also runs special attractions such as the Polar Express Train Ride every winter and operate non-passenger services in support of mainline companies.

Although no scheduled services operate between Dereham and the rest of the national network, in June 2009 the Association of Train Operating Companies published a document (Connecting Communities: Expanding Access to the Rail Network) calling for the restoration of services on a variety of former branch lines, including the Dereham branch. This £30m proposal would see regular services restored between Dereham and Norwich, operated subject to agreement with the Mid-Norfolk Railway Preservation Trust.

In 2020, the railway announced that they had, in association with partner organisations including Greater Anglia, Norfolk County Council, Breckland District Council and the New Anglia Local Enterprise Partnership, bid for funding for a feasibility study into reopening the line for regular commuter services over their route.  The plans to restore the line, and potentially extend it to Fakenham in time, have been backed by the George Freeman, MP for Mid-Norfolk. In June 2021, an unsuccessful funding bid was submitted as part of the second round of the Restoring Your Railway fund. A bid was re-submitted for the third round

Saint Withburga's Well
The town lies on the site of a monastery said by local tradition to have been founded by Saint Withburga in the seventh century. The saint died in 743AD. A holy well is at the western end of St Nicholas' Church yard, and the tradition claims this to have begun to flow when her body was stolen from the town by monks from Ely, who took the remains back to their town.

An attempt was made in 1752 to turn Dereham into a new Buxton or Bath by building a bathhouse over Withburga's Well. It was described at the time as a "hideous building of brick and plaster" and was never popular. The building was extensively modified in 1793 according to a book published in 1856.

The local vicar, Reverend Benjamin Armstrong, obtained permission in 1880 to pull the building down. The spring was then protected by iron railings but fell out of use and became choked with weeds. Since 1950, however, it has been kept clear of weeds, although the railings still prevent access to the waters. In a 2006 report on the church, Simon Knott indicated that by then, the "well" was actually a "sunken spring".

Today, the Church of England refers to St Nicholas Church as "Founded by St Withburga AD654", presumably because it may be on the same site as the monastery and convent she was said to have founded. The church has been a Grade I listed structure since 1951 (Entry #1077067).

Governance
Dereham has a Town Council made up of twelve members. It is the third tier of local government after Norfolk County Council and Breckland District Council, and is responsible for matters such as play areas, allotments, cemeteries and markets. Its assets include Dereham Memorial Hall, Neatherd Moor, Bishop Bonners Cottage, two cemeteries and six allotment sites. The Town Council meets at the Assembly Rooms on Rüthen Place.

Breckland District Council is also based in Dereham and has responsibility for services such as planning, housing, licensing and rubbish collection.

Industry and employment

Dereham was the home to the "Jentique" furniture factory which made boxes for both instruments and bombs during the Second World War. The town was also the home to the Metamec clock factory.

Hobbies of Dereham produced plans, kits and tools—including their famous treadle fretwork saws—for making wooden models and toys, which were popular in the days before moulded plastic. At one point, Hobbies owned ten shops in prestige locations all over the UK. In the early 1960s the firm was taken over by Great Universal Stores, who sold the shops and closed the business. However, due to a shrewd management purchase of the "old traditional" parts of the firm, Hobbies rose again, limiting itself to the role of specialist model-makers shop. After nearly 40 years of its new lease of life, Hobbies moved out of Dereham to new premises elsewhere in Norfolk at Raveningham, where it still trades today.

Cranes of Dereham, and its successor the Fruehauf trailer company, was a major employer in the town for many decades. Cranes built nearly all the giant trailers (100 tons plus) that carried equipment such as transformers at slow speeds across the UK, usually in the livery of Wynns or Pickfords. The launch of a new trailer was treated rather like that of a ship with many people coming out to see the leviathan move through the narrow streets of the town towards the A47. The town also had several large maltings. Almost all this large-scale industry has drifted away since the 1980s.

In March 2015 Crisp Maltings announced that they intended to restore the maltings complex beside the station to operational condition, producing malt for craft beer, as part of a planning application for a major housing development. The restoration was expected to cost £1 million.  In 2017 the plan to restore the Maltings was dropped, although the housing development was allowed to continue. As of 2020 the Maltings buildings have been made weathertight but they remain empty.

Companies currently based in Dereham include Flagship Housing and Zip Industries.

Economy
Dereham is a busy market town serving local residents and a wide rural area. The town has a market on Tuesdays and Fridays selling a range of food and household items. The town's shops are a mixture of local independent businesses and national chains. The Market Place and the High Street were the traditional shopping areas but in 2005 a new shopping area was created called Wright's Walk which is mainly occupied by national chains.

A second phase of development at Wright's Walk was envisaged but this has never been started. Instead, the land earmarked for this development has been used to create a pocket park offering a tranquil public meeting space, a community garden and a performance area. Funding for the park came from a £15,000 grant from the Pocket Park Fund - part of the Ministry of Housing, Communities and Local Government and an equal sum from Breckland Council.

Sport and leisure

An area of former railway and industrial land close to the town's station now serves as the location for a number of sports and leisure facilities. The Dereham Leisure Centre, built on the old railway locomotive depot, has a swimming pool, gym, dance and sports facilities.  Open air tennis courts, children's play equipment and a skate park are provided on the nearby Dereham recreation Ground. Strikes also operate a ten-pin bowling alley on the site.

Dereham has a non-League football club, Dereham Town, who play at Aldiss Park. As of the 2022–23 season, the team plays in the Northern Premier League Division One Midlands.

Dereham Town FC run the Dereham Education and Soccer Academy (DESA), a partnership between Northgate High School Sixth Form College and the football club. The programme allows students to follow a Level 3 BTEC in Sport alongside A levels and/or GCSE Maths and English retakes while also being part of a football academy. Graduates of DESA include Colchester United midfielder Luke Hannant and Swindon Town left-back Frazer Blake-Tracy.

Dereham Rugby Club, based on Moorgate Road, play in the Woodfordes League.

Dereham Cricket Club was formed in 1856. It plays home games at its ground on Norwich Road. Dereham Hockey Club is based nearby on Greenfield Road.

In August each year, Dereham hosts a 5K race on a two-lap course around the town. The race is organised by Dereham Runners. The first race was held in 2011.

Dereham featured on the 2012 Tour of Britain cycle race route during the first stage from Ipswich to the Norfolk Showground. The race entered the town from the Swanton Morley direction passing along Theatre Street, the Market Place and Norwich Street before leaving town via Norwich Road and heading towards Mattishall.

A footpath from the town links with the Wensum Way at Gressenhall.  This links to the Marriott's Way long-distance path to Norwich and Wroxham, and the Nar Valley Way to King's Lynn.

Neatherd Moor is an Urban Greenspace to the northeast of the town. It was designated as a County Wildlife Site in 2013.
Historically, the moor was used for grazing and sourcing raw materials until the early 1800s. Today it is used by walkers and joggers and has a modern children's play area.

A further large open space is Dereham Rush Meadow, a 22.2-hectare (55-acre) biological Site of Special Scientific Interest to the north-west of the town.

In 2005 Dereham gained a new £2,000,000 library. The building is spread over two floors and features a sedum roof over a single storey area of the ground floor. The library is the second most used in Norfolk, after the Millennium Library in Norwich.

Dereham has a three-screen cinema housed in the former Corn Exchange building. The building also hosts a nightclub called Metro. The building has had many incarnations including as a music venue in the 1960s when a range of top bands played there. These included Small Faces, Cream, Pink Floyd, The Jeff Beck Group
and The Jimi Hendrix Experience.

Youth and community provision

Schools

Nursery and pre-school
East Dereham Day Nursery
Magic Tree Day Nursery
Scarning Pre-School
Toftwood Nursery Pre-School

Infant and junior schools

Dereham CE VA Infant School and Nursery
 Dereham Church of England Junior Academy
Grove House Nursery and Infant Community School
King's Park Infant School
Scarning Primary school
Toftwood Infant School
 Toftwood Junior School

Secondary schools
Neatherd High School
Northgate High School

Sixth form college
Dereham Sixth Form College

Special School 
Fred Nicholson School

Youth groups
Dereham has two active Scout Groups, both of which are part of The Scout Association. 1st Dereham was one of the earliest Groups in the world, having been formed in 1908. In the past there was a 3rd Dereham Scout Group.

The town is the home of 1249 Squadron, Air Training Corps, who parade at the Cadet Centre on Norwich Road. The Army Cadets also parade at the same place.

Dereham is home to the youth theatre group DOSYTCo, which works with children to put on shows at the Dereham Memorial Hall, shows such as a 2015 production of Hairspray.

Attractions
Notable buildings in the town include the pargetted Bishop Bonner's Cottage, built in 1502, the Norman parish church, the East Dereham Windmill which was extensively renovated in 2013 and a large mushroom-shaped water tower. The Gressenhall Museum of Rural Life is nearby. 
The town also hosts the headquarters of the Mid-Norfolk Railway, which runs trains over an 11.5-mile railway south to Wymondham, as well as owning the line 6 miles north to North Elmham and County School Station. In spring 2020, that secondary line was being restored, but the railway (like other attractions) was closed until further notice due to the COVID-19 pandemic in the United Kingdom.

A guide to attractions in and near Dereham, intended to promote tourism, was scheduled to be published in late March 2020.

Dereham Blues Festival
Since 2013 Dereham has hosted an annual Blues Festival organised by The Norfolk Blues Society. The 2019 Festival saw 50 acts playing in 13 different venues which included pubs, clubs and unusual venues such as Dereham Cricket Club and the station at the Mid Norfolk Railway. All of the performances are free apart from the opening headline concert at Dereham Memorial Hall. Headline acts to date have been: 
2013 Ron Sayer Jnr and the Dave Thomas Band,
2014 Paul Jones,
2015 Mud Morganfield,
2016 Dr. Feelgood,
2017 Andy Fairweather Low and The Low Riders,
2018 Georgie Fame,
2019 Hamilton Loomis.
The 2020 Festival was due to run from 8 to 12 July with the headline act being Mike Sanchez performing with his band The Portions. However the Festival was cancelled due to the Coronavirus pandemic.
The festival will return in 2022 with 70 bands playing across 19 venues from 6th to the 10th of July. The headline acts were When Rivers Meet and Kyla Brox

Notable people

Notable people born in or associated with the town include:
 Thomas Eastoe Abbott poet,
 Brian Aldiss novelist, 
 Chris Baker (high jumper),
 Michael Barton (cricketer),
 George Borrow author,
 Bruce Bursford cyclist,
 Todd Cantwell footballer,
 Frederick Codd architect,
 Harry Cripps footballer, 
 Reverend Lionel Fanthorpe priest and entertainer,
 Sir John Fenn, antiquarian
 Lady Ellenor Fenn, author, 
 David Nicholls (cricketer), cricketer
 Beth Orton, singer,
 James Phillippo, abolitionist,
 George Skipper, architect,
 Freddie Steward, Rugby Union player 
 Ken Thorne, composer
 Matthew Vassar American brewer, merchant and philanthropist,
 William Hyde Wollaston scientist. 
 Henri Chopin avant-garde poet and musician lived out his later years and died in Dereham,
 William Cowper poet, died in Dereham, and is buried in St Nicholas's Church, where there is a commemorative stained glass window,
  David Fisher (writer), Dr Who scriptwriter lived in Dereham from 2001.
 Stephen Fry Comedian and Actor married his partner Elliot Spencer in the town on 17 January 2015.
 Mick Gault English sport shooter and multi medal winner at the Commonwealth Games lives in Dereham,
 Jim Mortram Social documentary photographer and writer is based in Dereham,
 The Oldhall family held the manor in the fourteenth and fifteenth centuries: notable members of the family included Sir William Oldhall, Speaker of the House of Commons and his brother Edmund Oldhall, Bishop of Meath. 
 William O'Callaghan survivor and hero of Le Paradis massacre during World War II, lived in Dereham for most of his life.
 Jo Pitt, para-equestrian.
Chris Rankin actor, attended Northgate High School, Dereham.

Twin towns
 Caudebec-lès-Elbeuf, France
 Rüthen, Germany

Notes

References

External links

Dereham Town Council website
Information from Genuki Norfolk on Dereham.

 
Populated places established in the 7th century
Breckland District
Market towns in Norfolk
Towns in Norfolk
Civil parishes in Norfolk